Ad Lib is a decorative typeface that was designed in 1961 by Freeman Craw for American Type Founders. It was extremely popular from the early- to mid-1960s, and is often used today to evoke that era.

The typeface is known for its square counters a-la the 60's. A SoftMaker version of this font has straighter edges for glyphs.

Notable examples of Ad Lib usage

Ad Lib was used for Felix the Cat episode titles.
Ad Lib was used for episode titles and "Same Bat Time, Same Bat Channel" text overlays on the 1960s Batman television series.
Ad Lib was used in the 1971 film Willy Wonka and the Chocolate Factory on the Augustus Gloop number.
Ad Lib was used in the 1976 film The Bad News Bears.
Ad Lib was used in the Pink Panther titles, as well as in the credits of the Looney Tunes shorts that DePatie-Freleng Enterprises produced from 1964 to 1967.
Ad Lib was used in film credits, such as The Outrage, A Guide for the Married Man, Clueless, Jay and Silent Bob Strike Back and A Man Called Dagger.
Ad Lib was used as the font to display scores on the television screen and for the logo on the first season of the 1996-99 version of The Dating Game.
Ad Lib was used for the titles of the television series Night Gallery which ran from 1970 to 1973.
Ad Lib was used for in the 1967 film In The Heat of the Night and the 1988 TV series based in the film.
Ad Lib was used in the episode title cards for A Pup Named Scooby-Doo and Yo Yogi!
Ad Lib and Banco are used in the logo for the Disney animated series Darkwing Duck.
Ad Lib was used once in the Courage the Cowardly Dog episode "Journey to the Center of Nowhere" for the episode's title card.
Ad Lib is used on the cover of the Nirvana live album From the Muddy Banks of the Wishkah.
Ad Lib was used on most Animaniacs tie-in merchandise.
Ad Lib is also used in the opening and closing credits of the animated series American Dad!.
Ad Lib is used for the title of Tyler Perry's Assisted Living
Ad Lib was used in the logo of the website Rotten Tomatoes prior to 2018.
Ad Lib was used throughout the Worms video game franchise, up until Worms Ultimate Mayhem.
Ad Lib was used in signage around Nickelodeon Studios alternately with the network's "Balloon" font.
Ad Lib was featured on the boxes of the 1996 MGM/UA reissue of Pee-wee's Playhouse.
Ad Lib was the dialogue font used in Luigi's Mansion 3.
Ad Lib was used on the title cards for children's show Maggie and the Ferocious Beast.
Ad Lib was used in the closing credits of some 90's Sesame Street home videos during the Around the Corner Era.
Ad Lib was used in The Wiggles TV series and home videos from 1997 to 2001.
Ad Lib was used as the logo of the English TV series That'll Teach 'Em.
Ad Lib was used for part of the title of the Soft Serve Cyclone menu item from the American restaurant chain Friendly's.
Ad Lib was used in the closing credits of Sabrina: The Animated Series.
Ad Lib was used in the logo for The Mighty Mighty Bosstones (and often on their album covers).
Ad Lib was used in print ads for Chuck E. Cheese in 1999.
Ad Lib was used in Foster's Home for Imaginary Friends in the episode "Frankie My Dear" for a fictional restaurant dubbed "Futurpoup", which translates to "Poop of the future".

References

External links

American Type Founders typefaces
Display typefaces
Typefaces and fonts introduced in 1961
Digital typefaces
Letterpress typefaces
Photocomposition typefaces